Uroš Sinđić (born 19 January 1986) is a Serbian professional footballer who plays as a defensive midfielder.

Career
In June 2017, Sinđić returned to Mladost Lučani after almost a decade. He helped the club reach the 2017–18 Serbian Cup final, eventually losing 2–1 to Partizan.

Honours
Mladost Lučani
 Serbian First League: 2006–07
 Serbian Cup: Runner-up 2017–18

References

External links
 Srbijafudbal profile
 
 

Association football midfielders
Expatriate footballers in Greece
FK Borac Čačak players
FK Donji Srem players
FK Mladost Lučani players
FK Sloboda Užice players
FK Voždovac players
OFK Beograd players
Panserraikos F.C. players
Serbia and Montenegro footballers
Serbian expatriate footballers
Serbian expatriate sportspeople in Greece
Serbian First League players
Serbian footballers
Serbian SuperLiga players
Sportspeople from Užice
Super League Greece players
1986 births
Living people